The Gordon Boswell Romany Museum is the lifetime's work of Gordon Boswell (died 27 August 2016, aged 76), who amassed a collection of artefacts, photographs, and several examples of the characteristic Gypsy wagon or Vardo. The museum also operates a number of non-Romany vehicles, including a horse-drawn hearse. The collection is housed at Clay Lake, Spalding in Lincolnshire, England.

Background
Building bridges to the non-Romany community was a tradition in Boswell's family. His great-grandfather had been an important source of information on Romany traditions and language for Victorian academics including George Borrow. Gordon Boswell's father Sylvester published in 1970 a best-selling autobiography, "The Book of Boswell", which portrayed the Romany life.  Gordon Boswell gradually collected waggons, carts, and other artefacts of Romany life over many years. The museum that resulted was opened on 25 February 1995.

Access
The museum is open on Fridays, Saturdays, Sundays and Bank Holidays between roughly Easter and the end of October each year.  There is access to all exhibits for the disabled.  An admission fee is charged.  The museum uses one of the wagons for organised trips in the nearby Fenland.

See also
 Vardo (Romani wagon)
 Romanichal

References

External links 
 Gordon Boswell Romany Museum – official site

Museums in Lincolnshire
Agriculture museums in the United Kingdom
Transport museums in England
Carriage museums in England
Ethnic museums in the United Kingdom
Spalding, Lincolnshire
Romani in England
Romani museums